The 1852 United States presidential election in Rhode Island took place on November 2, 1852, as part of the 1852 United States presidential election. Voters chose four representatives, or electors to the Electoral College, who voted for President and Vice President.

Rhode Island voted for the Democratic candidate, Franklin Pierce, over the Whig Party candidate, Winfield Scott. Pierce won the state by a margin of 6.52%.

This would be the final time until 1912 that a Democratic presidential candidate was able to win Rhode Island and the final time until 1928 that a Democratic candidate won a majority of the popular vote.

Results

See also
 United States presidential elections in Rhode Island

References

Rhode Island
1852
1852 Rhode Island elections